The Ribeirão Preto Street Circuit, was a street circuit opened in 2010, located in Ribeirão Preto. The circuit hosted Stock Car Brasil races in 2010–2013, and 2015. The circuit was originally also added  into the 2014 season, however the race was canceled in that year.

The circuit layout was changed three times. Átila Abreu was the most successful driver on that circuit, he won 2 times in 2010 and 2011.

Lap records

The official fastest lap records at the Ribeirão Preto Street Circuit are listed as:

References 

Ribeirão Preto
Ribeirão Preto
Ribeirão Preto
Ribeirão Preto
Ribeirão Preto